Stanislaus Henry Marple is a Canadian former professional ice hockey player and coach. Marple played twelve seasons in various British leagues, most notably for the Guildford Flames, for whom he later served as head coach. He is currently the general manager for the University of Alberta's men's hockey team, the Alberta Golden Bears.

Clubs

Note: Marple could not play regularly after 2005 because of the EPL 4 import rule, therefore he could only play when other imports were injured.

Playing career
Marple had his number 3 retired by Guildford. The Flames gained ten titles while Marple was head coach and general manager.

Statistics

General manager / coaching record and titles
Marple's coaching record at Guildford is as follows: 396 wins, 174 losses, 42 ties and overtime losses.
His record during his time as GM is as follows: 213 wins, 55 losses.

Marple's titles for his clubs as head coach & or general manager are as follows:

External links
 

1968 births
Living people
Alberta Golden Bears ice hockey players
Basingstoke Beavers players
British National League (1996–2005) players
Canadian ice hockey coaches
Canadian ice hockey right wingers
Delta Flyers players
English Premier Ice Hockey League players
Guildford Flames players
Ice hockey people from Alberta
Milton Keynes Kings players
Swindon Icelords players
St. Albert Saints players
Victoria Cougars (WHL) players
Place of birth missing (living people)
Canadian expatriate ice hockey players in England